John Egorugwu (born May 21, 1986) is an American football inside linebackers coach for the New York Giants of the National Football League (NFL). Egorugwu most recently served as the Linebackers coach at Vanderbilt in 2021. He has spent time coaching with other National Football League teams including the Baltimore Ravens and Buffalo Bills.

Playing career 
John Egorugwu was a Linebacker at William Jewell Cardinals from 2004-2007. He played in 29 games, had 156 career tackles, 22 tackles for loss, 7.0 sacks, and 2 interception during his time at William Jewell.

Coaching career

William Jewell
Egorugwu got his start in coaching at his alma mater, William Jewell as their Linebackers coach from 2010 until the end of the 2011 season.

Missouri
Egorugwu got hired by Missouri as a graduate assistant, working with both the defense in 2012 and offense in 2013 and 2014. During his time in Missouri he won his first bowl game 2014 Cotton Bowl Classic with the teams victory over the Oklahoma State with the final score (41-31). He would win his second bowl game the following year 2015 Citrus Bowl with the teams victory over Minnesota with the final score (33-17).

Missouri State
On December 18, 2014, Egorugwu was hired by Missouri State as their Wide receivers coach under head coach Dave Steckel.

Baltimore Ravens
On April 16, 2015, Egorugwu was hired by the Baltimore Ravens as a defensive staff assistant under head coach John Harbaugh.

Buffalo Bills
On February 2, 2017, Egorugwu was hired by Buffalo Bills as their defensive quality control coach and assistant linebackers coach under head coach Sean McDermott. In 2018, the Bills linebacker group recorded 7 interceptions and tied for most in the league with the New York Giants.

Vanderbilt
On February 4, 2021, Egorugu was hired by Vanderbilt as their Linebackers coach under head coach Clark Lea.

New York Giants
On February 14, 2022, Egorugwu was hired by the New York Giants as their inside linebackers coach under head coach Brian Daboll.

References

External links
 https://vucommodores.com/coach/john-egorugwu/
 https://www.giants.com/team/coaches-roster/john-egorugwu

Living people
New York Giants coaches
Buffalo Bills coaches
1986 births